= Dubberman Finland =

Finnish dubbing company

- Industry: Dubbing
- Headquarters: Helsinki, Finland
- Website: Official website

Dubberman Oy is a Finnish dubbing company based in Helsinki. It is the Finnish branch of Dubberman. The company does dubbing for TV channels and film distributors.
